This article refers to the island located in Waterloo, Iowa.  For further uses of the name "Sans Souci", see Sans Souci
Sans Souci Island is an island in the Cedar River in the city of Waterloo, Iowa. The island was severely affected by the Iowa flood of 2008. By June 10, 2008, the island's entire population was forced to evacuate following the breach of a sandbag dike.

See also
Waterloo, Iowa
Iowa flood of 2008
Cedar River

References

Waterloo, Iowa
2008 floods in the United States
Natural disasters in Iowa
Landforms of Black Hawk County, Iowa
River islands of Iowa